Cross belt or crossbelt is a type of belt in military uniforms.

The term may also refer to:
Cross Belt (film), Malayalam film
Crossbelt Mani, Malayalam film director
Cross-belt, an element of the Sam Browne belt
Crossbelt sorter